was a Japanese businessman who was the president and CEO of the Honda Motor Co., Ltd.

Career 
Tadashi Kume joined Honda in 1954, eventually becoming Honda's 3rd president in 1983. He specialized in designing engines, and, along with other engineers, helped develop the fuel-efficient CVCC. Before becoming president, Kume had a heated argument with then Honda president Soichiro Honda over using air-cooled or water-cooled engines, which led Kume to stay away from work for possibly over a month.  He retired in June 1990, and was succeeded by Nobuhiko Kawamoto. Kume is honored in the Japan Automotive Hall of Fame.

References

1931 births
2022 deaths
Japanese chief executives
Japanese automotive engineers
Honda people
Shizuoka University alumni
Recipients of the Medal with Purple Ribbon
People from Hyōgo Prefecture